Manmohan Singh Liberhan (born 11 November 1938) is a retired Chief Justice of the Andhra Pradesh High Court, India. For 17 years he headed the Liberhan Ayodhya Commission of Inquiry, which prepared a report on the Babri Mosque demolition.

Career
Liberhan was formerly the Advocate General for the north-Indian state of Haryana. He was soon thereafter elevated as a permanent judge of the Punjab and Haryana High Court. He was appointed the chairman of the Liberhan Ayodhya Commission of Inquiry by the then Prime Minister, PV Narasimha Rao. According to the Commission, the events of 6 December 1992 in Ayodhya were "neither spontaneous nor unplanned".

Liberhan was subsequently transferred to the Madras High Court as Chief Justice of that court. Shortly thereafter, he was transferred to the Andhra Pradesh High Court from where he retired.

He continued to hold his position as the chairman of the Liberhan Commission till 2009.

He lives in Chandigarh, India.

See also
Liberhan Commission

References

External links
Profile at Andhra Pradesh High Court website
 Report Of The Liberhan Ayodhya Commission of Inquiry - Full Text in PDF format (126 MB)
Alternate link - Full Text in PDF format (126 MB)

20th-century Indian judges
Living people
1938 births
Scholars from Chandigarh
Chief Justices of the Madras High Court
Chief Justices of the Andhra Pradesh High Court